Dughmur is a small coastal village in the eastern coast of Oman. The village is located within Ash Sharqiyah South Governorate not so far from Sur.

Populated places in Oman